The Saksena–Evans reduction is a diastereoselective reduction of β-hydroxy ketones to the corresponding anti-dialcohols, employing the reagent tetramethylammonium triacetoxyborohydride (Me4NHB(OAc)3). The reaction was first described by Anil K. Saksena in 1983 and further developed by David A. Evans in 1987.

The reaction is thought to proceed through the 6-membered ring transition state shown below. The intramolecular hydride delivery from the boron reducing agent forces the reduction to proceed from the opposite face of the chelating β-alcohol, thus determining the diastereoselectivity.

This can be contrasted with the Narasaka–Prasad reduction which similarly employs a boron chelating agent but undergoes an intermolecular hydride delivery, favouring the corresponding syn-diol product.

The Saksena-Evans reduction has since been used in the synthesis of several products, particularly the bryostatins.

See also 
Evans–Tishchenko reaction

References 

Name reactions